Perla Haney-Jardine (born 2 May 1997) is a Brazilian-American actress, best known for her role as B.B. in the 2004 movie Kill  Bill: Volume 2.

Personal life
Haney-Jardine was born in Niterói, Brazil. Her father, Chusy Haney-Jardine, is a Venezuelan-born director, and her mother, Jennifer MacDonald, is an American film producer.

She started doing commercials before going into movies. Her family lives in Asheville, North Carolina, where she graduated high school from Asheville School.

Career
Haney-Jardine first appeared in Kill Bill: Volume 2 as BB, the daughter of Beatrix Kiddo (Uma Thurman) and Bill (David Carradine). She
starred in the 2005 film Dark Water with Jennifer Connelly and Tim Roth, and as Penny Marko, the Sandman's sick daughter, in Spider-Man 3 in 2007. In 2008 she starred as Diane Lane's daughter in the film Untraceable.

Filmography

Film

Awards and nominations

References

External links
 

1997 births
Living people
People from Niterói
Brazilian people of American descent
Brazilian people of Venezuelan descent
American people of Venezuelan descent
American child actresses
American film actresses
Brazilian emigrants to the United States
Actresses from North Carolina
21st-century American actresses